Long Island, New York is not known for having many tall buildings.  As a suburban region, residents and local governments have generally opposed proposals to construct tall buildings, to distinguish it from neighboring Queens and Brooklyn, which are geographically part of Long Island but are part of New York City. Most of the tallest buildings were constructed by government entities, who are exempt from local zoning regulations.

Long Island has no cluster of high-rises dense enough to create an urban landscape, although there are regions with a larger number of scattered high-rises. A number of non-building structures are also prominent, such as the  stacks of the Northport Power Station.

This article covers buildings in Nassau County and Suffolk County.  Buildings in Queens and in Brooklyn are listed in their own articles, as the New York City boroughs are conventionally excluded from cultural definitions of Long Island.

Overview 
Long Island has few tall buildings, in contrast to neighboring New York City.  Long Island's identity as the birthplace of suburbia involves a desire to maintain the opposite of an urban landscape, with a flat landscape where high-rises are seen to be eyesores that clash with their surroundings, and even three-story buildings can provoke opposition.  This has been characterized as a desire to prevent Long Island from being "Queensified", referring to the neighboring New York City borough.  The North Shore Towers complex of three 32-story apartment buildings, immediately over the border from Nassau County in Queens, has been often cited as the kind of development Long Islanders seek to avoid.

It has been noted that since most buildings are lower than the trees, views from the few tall buildings consists almost of treetops punctuated by water towers.  The buildings themselves are generally regarded as being architecturally undistinguished.

As of 1974, there were 107 municipal zoning codes on Long Island, most of which limited buildings to four stories; in 2016 there were 175 zoning and building districts, stymieing the construction of tall buildings.  Most tall buildings on Long Island have been built by the state or county rather than private developers, as they are exempt from these local codes.  The opposition to high-rises also had a racial element, being stereotypically associated with minority residents.

Patterns of development 
While Long Island has no cluster of high-rises dense enough to create an urban landscape, there are regions with a larger number of scattered high-rises.  One is the region in and around northern Uniondale in central Nassau County, including Hofstra University's library and six dormitory buildings, Nassau University Medical Center, Nassau Community College, four office buildings, and a hotel.  Another cluster of mid-rise apartment buildings is along the waterfront in Long Beach.

A handful of tall buildings are part of former state psychiatric institutions scattered around Suffolk County, including Edgewood State Hospital (now demolished), Kings Park Psychiatric Center, and Pilgrim Psychiatric Center.

Long Island also has several non-building structures, including broadcast antennas, smokestacks, and water towers.  The most prominent of these are the four 620-foot stacks of the Northport Power Station, and other power plants constructed by the Long Island Lighting Company.

History 
In the mid 20th century, Democrats generally favored more high-rises, while Republicans opposed them.  In the late 2000s, the Lighthouse Project proposal to construct a 60-story tower, later changed to two 30-story towers, near Nassau Coliseum was vigorously opposed.

The 21st century saw the beginning of a movement in certain regions towards transit-oriented development around Long Island Rail Road stations, with 11,000 housing units approved in the nine years preceding 2016.  The villages of Hempstead and Mineola were seen as being particularly receptive to taller residential buildings, along with Great Neck Plaza, Glen Cove, Long Beach, Farmingdale, Ronkonkoma, Riverhead, and Riverside.  On the other hand, the proposed Nassau Hub development surrounding Nassau Coliseum is envisioned as a "walkable, engaging suburban downtown" with no buildings over 100 feet.  Increasing the number of rental units, which are rare in the region, was seen as important to attracting young adults and thus employers, as well as retaining older residents who might otherwise relocate to Florida.

Buildings 

A building is defined as a structure with walls and a roof.

Other structures

At least 300 feet

Other notable structures at least 100 feet

References 

Long Island
Lists of tallest buildings in New York (state)